Hákonarmál (Old Norse: 'The Song of Hákon') is a skaldic poem which the skald Eyvindr skáldaspillir composed about the fall of the Norwegian king Hákon the Good at the battle of Fitjar and his reception in Valhalla. This poem emulates Eiríksmál and is intended to depict the Christian Hákon as a friend to the pagan gods. The poem is preserved in its entirety and is widely considered to be of great beauty.

These are the last three stanzas.

The last stanza is clearly related to a stanza from Hávamál. The traditional view is that Hákonarmál borrowed from that poem but it is also possible that the relation is reversed or that both poems drew on a third source.

References

Bibliography

External links
 Hákonarmál in Old Norse from heimskringla.no
 English translation and commentary by Lee M. Hollander
 Samuel Laing's translation (within its Heimskringla context)
 Two editions of the poem

Skaldic poems
Sources of Norse mythology
Ladejarl dynasty